The Langrial  (لنگر يا ل)  is a clan of Rajputs in Pakistan.

References

Rajputs